Robin Oake  is the former Chief Constable of the Isle of Man Constabulary and before that Assistant Chief Constable of Greater Manchester Police.

He was Chief Constable of the Isle of Man from 1986 to 1999, when he was succeeded by Mike Culverhouse.

He is the father of Detective Constable Stephen Oake, who was stabbed to death while attempting to arrest an Al Qaeda suspect. He was nominated for the George Cross, but was instead awarded the Queen's Gallantry Medal. Oake wrote the book Father Forgive: The Forgotten 'F' Word following his son's murder. Robin is a strong evangelical Christian, like Stephen Oake was, and publicly forgave his son's murderer.

He is chairman of the Isle of Man Commonwealth Games Association.

Footnotes

References
Forgiveness of killer
Reactions to Stephen Oake's death, BBC Manchester

Living people
Year of birth missing (living people)
Manx Chief Constables
British police chief officers
English recipients of the Queen's Police Medal